The Spirit of de Grisogono is the world's largest cut black diamond and the world's fifth largest diamond overall. The resulting mogul-cut diamond weighs  and is set in a white gold ring with 702 smaller white diamonds totaling . The ring is said to have been sold.

See also
 List of diamonds

References
 Sybarites. "Spirit of De Grisogono, The Worlds Largest Black Diamond". Retrieved Sept. 27, 2007.
 Peora. "The Spirit of De Grisogono". Retrieved Sept. 27, 2007.

Individual diamonds
Black diamonds
Diamonds originating in the Central African Republic